The following is a list of United States cities, towns, and census designated places in which a majority (over 50%) of the population is non-Hispanic African American/Black alone as of the 2020 U.S. Census.

Alabama

Population over 100,000
Birmingham (2020, 68.12%)

Population 25,000 to 99,999
Bessemer (2020, 69.59%)

Population 10,000 to 24,999
Fairfield (2020, 94.74%)
Forestdale CDP (2020, 78.65%)
Prichard (2020, 84.58%)
Selma (2020, 82.12%)

Population 5,000 to 9,999
Demopolis (2020, 54.02%)
 Grayson Valley CDP (2020, 51.97%)
Lanett (2020, 58.79%)
Midfield (2020, 84.03%)
Tuskegee (2020, 94.34%)

Population 1,000 to 4,999
Aliceville (2020, 77.12%)
Brighton (2020, 77.24%)
Brundidge (2020, 67.34%)
Camden (2020, 58.48%)
Camp Hill (2020, 86.98%)
Clayton (2020, 62.38%)
Eutaw (2020, 81.99%)
Evergreen (2020, 59.52%)
Fort Deposit
Georgiana (2020, 72.51%)
Goodwater (2020, 75.29%)
Greensboro (2020, 67.76%)
Lipscomb (2020, 61.79%)
Livingston (2020, 58.47%)
Marion (2020, 68.83%)
Mount Vernon (2020, 74.15%)
Selmont-West Selmont CDP
Union Springs (2020, 75.88%)
Uniontown (2020, 90.32%)
York (2020, 89.56%)

Population 100 to 999
Akron
Autaugaville (2020, 66.79%)
Beatrice
Boligee (2020, 89.70%)
Boykin (2020, 93.75%)
Colony (2020, 83.33%)
Edgewater CDP (2020, 69.57%)
Epes
Five Points
Forkland (2020, 87.87%)
Franklin
Geiger
Gordon (2020, 64.63%)
Gordonville
Hayneville
Hillsboro
Hissop CDP (2020, 74.64%)
Hobson City
Hurtsboro (2020, 53.87%)
Lisman
Loachapoka
Macedonia (2020, 87.14%)
Midway
Mosses
Newbern
Nixburg CDP (2020, 66.87%)
North Courtland
Pine Hill (2020, 53.56%)
Pickensville (2020, 61.40%)
Sawyerville
Shorter
Thomaston
Union (2020, 97.78%)
Vredenburgh
White Hall
Yellow Bluff (2020, 98.56%)

Population under 100
Catherine CDP (2020, 56.92%)
Dayton
Emelle
McMullen (2020, 87.50%)
Memphis (2020, 82.76%)
Ridgeville (2020, 59.04%)

Arkansas

Population over 25,000
Pine Bluff (2020, 76.95%)

Population 10,000 to 24,999
Blytheville (2020, 60.00%)
Forrest City (2020, 70.56%)
West Memphis (2020, 65.61%)

Population 5,000 to 9,999
Helena-West Helena (2020, 75.68%)
Osceola (2020, 55.81%)

Population 1,000 to 4,999
Dermott (2020, 77.73%)
Dumas (2020, 62.76%)
Earle (2020, 85.75%)
Eudora (2020, 90.28%)
Hughes (2020, 76.70%)
Lake Village (2020, 62.23%)
Marianna (2020, 76.92%)
McAlmont (2020, 77.47%)
Stamps (2020, 55.09%)
Waldo (2020, 71.42%)
Wrightsville (2020, 59.86%)

Population 100 to 999
Altheimer
Anthonyville
Bluff City
Bradley
Carthage
Chidester (2020, 50.99%)
College Station CDP (2020, 92.75%)
Edmondson
Elaine
Fredonia
Garland (2020, 72.82%)
Gilmore (2020, 57.95%)
Goodwin CDP (2020, 62.83%)
Gould (2020, 85.97%)
Grady (2020, 59.67%)
Harrell
Haynes
Hensley CDP (2020, 62.77%)
Holly Grove (2020, 92.39%)
Jennette (2020, 89.83%)
Lake View
Luxora (2020, 56.58%)
Madison
Marvell
McNeil
Menifee (2020, 75.91%)
Mitchellville
Montrose (2020, 71.60%)
Parkdale (2020, 68.02%)
Parkin (2020, 66.25%)
Poplar Grove CDP (2020, 65.58%)
Reed
Rondo
Rosston
Strong
Sunset
Sweet Home CDP (2020, 70.22%)
Tollette (2020, 93.51%)
Turrell (2020, 88.59%)
Twin Groves
Wabbaseka
Widener (2020, 64.15%)
Wilmar
Wilmot (2020, 77.16%)
Winchester
Woodson CDP (2020, 67.63%)

Population under 100
Allport
Birdsong
Gum Springs
Jericho
LaGrange
Tucker CDP (2020, 93.68%)
Washington

California
Population over 10,000
View Park-Windsor Hills CDP (2020, 70.48%)

Population 5,000 to 9,999
Ladera Heights (2020, 63.59%)

Connecticut
Population 10,000 to 24,999
 Bloomfield (2020, 53.09%)
Population 1,000 to 4,999
 Blue Hills (2020, 83.27%)

Delaware
Population over 50,000
 Wilmington (2020, 54.48%)

Florida

Population over 100,000
 Miami Gardens (2020, 61.87%)

Population 25,000 to 99,999
 Golden Glades CDP (2020, 68.31%)
 Lauderdale Lakes (2020, 83.40%)
 Lauderhill (2020, 75.61%)
 North Miami (2020, 50.50%)
 Pine Hills CDP (2020, 67.63%)
 Riviera Beach (2020, 60.84%)

Population 10,000 to 24,999
 Belle Glade (2020, 56.49%)
 Brownsville CDP (2020, 50.94%)
 Gladeview CDP (2020, 58.84%)
 Pinewood CDP (2020, 66.09%)
 West Park (2020, 55.29%)

Population 5,000 to 9,999
 Fort Pierce North CDP (2020, 64.80%)
 Gifford CDP (2020, 75.10%)
 Lake Park (2020, 53.53%)
 Pahokee (2020, 56.77%)
 Quincy (2020, 60.98%)
 Richmond Heights CDP (2020, 51.93%)
 South Apopka CDP (2020, 54.81%)
 Westview CDP (2020, 56.29%)

Population 1,000 to 4,999
 Boulevard Gardens CDP
 Century (2020, 55.34%)
 Cypress Quarters CDP
 Eatonville
 Goulding CDP
 Gretna (2020, 81.36%)
 Harlem CDP
 Havana (2020, 51.28%)
 Madison (2020, 63.50%)
 Mangonia Park (2020, 81.37%)
 Midway CDP (Seminole County)
 South Bay (2020, 63.72%)
 Tangelo Park CDP

Population under 1,000
 Campbellton (2020, 55.50%)
 Charleston Park CDP
 East Williston CDP
 Greenville (2020, 64.34%)
 Homestead Base CDP (2020, 52.85%)
 Jacob City (2020, 88.02%)
 Limestone Creek CDP
 Tildenville CDP

Georgia

Population over 100,000
 Augusta (2020, 55.19%)☆
 Macon (2020, 54.17%)☆☆
 South Fulton (2020, 89.79%)

Population 25,000 to 99,999
 Albany (2020, 74.59%)
 Douglasville (2020, 64.09%)
 East Point (2020, 76.01%)
 Redan (2020, 88.99%)
 Stonecrest (2020, 91.39%)
 Union City (2020, 84.55%)
 Valdosta (2020, 54.28%)

Population 10,000 to 24,999
 Americus (2020, 62.1%)
 Bainbridge (2020, 56.03%)
 Belvedere Park CDP (2020, 61.60%)
 Brunswick (2020, 56.20%)
 Candler-McAfee CDP (2020, 80.11%)
 Clarkston (2020, 64.32%)
 College Park (2020, 79.09%)
 Cordele (2020, 66.69%)
 Dublin (2020, 61.04%)
 Fairburn (2020, 76.45%)
 Griffin (2020, 52.74%)
 Panthersville (2020, 90.74%)
 Powder Springs (2020, 54.36%)
 Riverdale (2020, 77.84%)
 Thomasville (2020, 52.30%)
 Waycross (2020, 55.03%)

Population 5,000 to 9,999
 Austell (2020, 58.34%)
 Blakely (2020, 69.00%)
 Camilla (2020, 72.89%)
 Conley (2020, 60.88%)
 Eatonton (2020, 56.33%)
 Fort Valley 2020, 77.73%)
 Gresham Park CDP (2020, 72.68%)
 Palmetto (2020, 58.15%)
 Sandersville (2020, 63.22%)
 Stone Mountain (2020, 72.31%)
 Sylvester (2020, 59.21%)
 Thomson (2020, 65.85%)
 Waynesboro (2020, 66.58%)

Population 1,000 to 4,999
 Abbeville (2020, 61.04%)
 Arlington (2020, 79.74%)
 Ashburn (2020, 65.98%)
 Boston (2020, 60.07%)
 Buena Vista (2020, 61.20%)
 Cuthbert (2020, 80.4%)
 Davisboro (2020, 69.49%)
 Dawson (2020, 81.97%)
 Donalsonville (2020, 61.21%)
 Edison (2020, 72.68%)
 Experiment CDP
 Gordon (2020, 52.94%)
 Greensboro (2020, 60.20%)
 Hardwick CDP (2020, 72.36%)
 Heron Bay CDP (2020, 63.88%)
 Jonesboro (2020, 53.06%)
 Lithonia (2020, 83.10%)
 Louisville (2020, 67.83%)
 Marshallville (2020, 77.67%)
 Millen (2020, 59.78%)
 Montezuma (2020, 71.38%)
 Morgan (2020, 67.78%)
 Ocilla (2020, 51.14%)
 Pelham (2020, 59.37%)
 Quitman (2020, 69.02%)
 Richland (2020, 70.58%)
 Soperton (2020, 56.87%)
 Sparta (2020, 82.24%)
 Tennille
 Unadilla (2020, 65.04%)
 Unionville CDP (2020, 94.67%)
 Vienna (2020, 70.97%)
 Wadley (2020, 77.97%)
 Walthourville (2020, 57.15%)
 Warrenton (2020, 73.17%)
 Washington (2020, 60.66%)
 West Point (2020, 54.88%)
 Wrens (2020, 65.54%)
 Wrightsville (2020, 52.71%)

Population 100 to 999
 Alapaha
 Baconton (2020, 55.96%)
 Bartow
 Bronwood
 Byromville
 Camak
 Coleman
 Crawfordville
 Culloden
 Damascus
 Danville
 De Soto
 Eulonia CDP (2020, 62.11%)
 Flovilla
 Fort Gaines (2020, 75.48%)
 Gough CDP (2020, 72.26%)
 Greenville (2020, 59.57%)
 Harrison
 Hilltop
 Hiltonia
 Ideal (2020, 66.34%)
 Irwinton (2020, 52.35%)
 Jeffersonville (2020, 64.69%)
 Junction City
 Keysville
 Lincoln Park CDP
 Lumber City (2020, 52.43%)
 Lumpkin (2020, 67.23%)
 McIntyre
 Meigs (2020, 62.07%)
 Midville
 Morven
 Musella CDP (2020, 67.31%)
 Newton
 Norwood
 Oglethorpe (2020, 68.84%)
 Oliver
 Payne 
 Phillipsburg CDP (2020, 96.09%)
 Pineview (2020, 65.42%)
 Plains
 Rains CDP (2020, 72.31%)
 Riceboro (2020, 82.76%)
 Salem
 Sharon
 Shellman (2020, 63.30%)
 Siloam
 Smithville (2020, 67.96%)
 Talbotton (2020, 80.86%)
 Toomsboro
 Warthen CDP (2020, 61.36%)
 Warwick (2020, 56.55%)
 Woodbury (2020, 55.51%)
 Woodland
 Woodville

Population under 100
 Dooling (2020, 67.65%)
 Geneva

☆Consolidated city-county with Richmond County
☆☆Consolidated city-county with Bibb County

Illinois

Population over 25,000
 Calumet City (2020, 72.04%)

Population 10,000 to 25,000
 Bellwood (2020, 67.62%)
 Cahokia☆
 Country Club Hills (2020, 85.63%)
 Dolton (2020, 90.18%)
 East St. Louis (2020, 94.95%)
 Harvey (2020, 62.63%)
 Hazel Crest (2020, 85.50%)
 Markham (2020, 72.21%)
 Matteson (2020, 82.01%)
 Maywood (2020, 60.36%)
 Park Forest (2020, 69.27%)
 Richton Park (2020, 86.01%)
 Riverdale (2020, 91.82%)
 South Holland (2020, 80.49%)

Population 5,000 to 9,999
 Broadview (2020, 70.54%)
 Calumet Park (2020, 88.68%)
 Flossmoor (2020, 58.17%)
 Glenwood (2020, 74.54%)
 Lynwood (2020, 75.35%)
 Sauk Village (2020, 67.27%)
 University Park (2020, 86.76%)

Population 1,000 to 4,999
 Alorton☆
 Burnham (2020, 59.79%)
 Cairo (2020, 68.84%)
 Centreville☆
 East Hazel Crest (2020, 57.67%)
 Ford Heights (2020, 91.06%)
 Olympia Fields (2020, 77.32%)
 Phoenix (2020, 84.60%)
 Robbins (2020, 84.42%)
 Venice
 Washington Park
 Willowbrook CDP (2020, 51.41%)

Population under 1,000
 Brooklyn
 Hopkins Park
 Mound City
 Mounds
 Oak Grove
 Pulaski
 Royal Lakes
 Sun River Terrace (2020, 73.41%)

☆Cahokia, Allerton, and Centreville merged in May 2021 to form the city of Cahokia Heights

Indiana
Population over 50,000
Gary (2020, 79.11%)

Louisiana

Population over 100,000
 Baton Rouge (2020, 53.55%)
 New Orleans (2020, 53.61%)
 Shreveport (2020, 55.77%)

Population 24,999 to 99,999
 Alexandria (2020, 54.65%)
 Marrero (2020, 50.12%)
 Monroe (2020, 63.24%)

Population 10,000 to 24,999
 Baker (2020, 81.99%)
 Minden (2020, 53.25%)
 Natchitoches (2020, 54.84%)
 Opelousas (2020, 77.18%)
 Woodmere CDP (2020, 79.28%)

Population 5,000 to 9,999
 Bastrop (2020, 75.41%)
 Brownfields CDP (2020, 79.01%)
 Donaldsonville (2020, 77.31%)
 Franklin (2020, 54.99%)
 Grambling (2020, 96.47%)
 Jeanerette (2020, 71.00%)
 Merrydale CDP (2020, 92.84%)
 Monticello CDP (2020, 86.98%)
 Reserve (2020, 58.67%)
 St. Martinville (2020, 60.23%)
 Tallulah (2020, 80.13%)
 Ville Platte (2020, 64.56%)
 Waggaman CDP (2020, 64.62%)

Population 1,000 to 4,999
 Amite City (2020, 54.43%)
 Arcadia (2020, 69.01%)
 Baldwin (2020, 62.71%)
 Belle Rose CDP
 Bernice (2020, 58.70%)
 Boutte (2020, 56.12%)
 Bunkie (2020, 61.00%)
 Clinton (2020, 52.91%)
 Colfax (2020, 58.40%)
 Coushatta (2020, 67.07%)
 Delhi (2020, 65.87%)
 Edgard (2020, 89.37%)
 Epps
 Farmerville (2020, 64.23%)
 Ferriday (2020, 84.79%)
 Homer (2020, 68.58%)
 Jonesville (2020, 75.41%)
 Kentwood (2020, 76.55%)
 Lake Providence (2020, 80.37%)
 Mansfield (2020, 78.3%)
 Mansura (2020, 61.29%)
 New Roads (2020, 56.98%)
 North Vacherie
 Port Allen (2020, 59.77%)
 Rayville (2020, 72.42%)
 Richwood (2020, 58.70%)
 Ringgold (2020, 56.93%)
 Supreme CDP
 West Ferriday CDP
 White Castle (2020, 90.19%)
 Winnsboro (2020, 72.77%)

Population 100 to 999
 Bonita
 Boyce (2020, 69.26%)
 Campti (2020, 76.55%)
 Cheneyville (2020, 68.38%)
 Clarence (2020, 73.31%)
 Clayton (2020, 72.95%)
 Cullen (2020, 86.45%)
 Darrow CDP (2020, 82.50%)
 Dorseyville CDP (2020, 100.00%)
 East Hodge
 Fenton
 Gibsland (2020, 85.38%)
 Grand Coteau (2020, 62.24%)
 Harrisonburg
 Killona CDP
 Lecompte (2020, 65.33%)
 Lemannville CDP (2020, 76.69%)
 Lucky
 Maringouin (2020, 86.42%)
 Marion (2020, 57.95%)
 Morrow CDP (2020, 81.88%)
 Napoleonville (2020, 79.26%)
 Natchez (2020, 93.25%)
 Newellton (2020, 72.80%)
 Pioneer
 Powhatan
 Roseland (2020, 61.36%)
 St. Joseph (2020, 77.14%)
 Sicily Island
 South Mansfield
 Tangipahoa (2020, 85.18%)
 Wallace CDP (2020, 87.81%)
 Washington (2020, 55.26%)
 Waterproof (2020, 90.76%)
 Wilson (2020, 74.43%)

Population under 100
 Palmetto

Maryland

Population over 100,000
Baltimore (2020, 63.28%)

Population 24,999 to 99,999
Bowie (2020, 52.86%)
Clinton CDP (2020, 77.18%)
Fairland CDP (2020, 56.70%)
Landover CDP (2020, 64.03%)
Lochearn CDP (2020, 80.37%)
Milford Mill CDP (2020, 82.82%)
Owings Mills CDP (2020, 59.47%)
Randallstown CDP (2020, 80.68%)
South Laurel CDP (2020, 56.11%)
Suitland CDP (2020, 86.78%)
Waldorf CDP (2020, 62.87%)
Woodlawn CDP (Baltimore County) (2020, 55.87%)

Population 10,000 to 24,999
Accokeek CDP (2020, 67.10%)
Bensville CDP (2020, 55.74%)
Bladensburg (2020, 53.49%)
Brandywine CDP (2020, 76.08%)
Brock Hall CDP (2020, 86.79%)
Camp Springs CDP (2020, 74.10%)
Forestville CDP (2020, 80.82%)
Fort Washington CDP (2020, 63.20%)
Glassmanor CDP (2020, 73.69%)
Glenn Dale CDP (2020, 60.89%)
Hillcrest Heights CDP (2020, 86.57%)
Kettering CDP (2020, 89.96%)
Lake Arbor CDP (2020, 85.32%)
Lanham CDP (2020, 53.16%)
Largo CDP (2020, 87.32%)
Mitchellville CDP (2020, 82.78%)
New Carrollton (2020, 52.07%)
Oxon Hill CDP (2020, 64.20%)
Rosaryville CDP (2020. 81.40%)
Seabrook CDP (2020, 60.44%)
Summerfield CDP (2020, 86.44%)
Walker Mill CDP (2020, 88.10%)
Westphalia CDP (2020, 78.72%)
White Oak CDP (2020, 56.29%)

Population 5,000 to 9,999
Bryans Road CDP (2020, 61.82%)
Coral Hills CDP (2020, 80.64%)
District Heights (2020, 84.41%)
Fairwood CDP (2020, 76.12%)
Friendly CDP (2020, 67.39%)
Glenarden (2020, 77.37%)
Jessup CDP (2020, 54.56%)
Marlboro Village CDP (2020, 87.09%)
Marlow Heights CDP (2020, 74.92%)
Marlton CDP (2020, 82.62%)
National Harbor CDP (2020, 54.17%)
Peppermill Village CDP (2020, 80.81%)
Silver Hill CDP (2020, 89.33%)
Temple Hills CDP (2020, 81.83%)

Population 1,000 to 4,999
Brown Station CDP (2020, 81.84%)
Cedar Heights CDP (2020, 82.03%)
Capitol Heights (2020, 81.33%)
Fairmount Heights (2020, 71.40%)
Forest Heights (2020, 57.45%)
Indian Head (2020, 60.14%)
Konterra CDP (2020, 50.06%)
Marlboro Meadows CDP (2020, 78.80%)
Melwood CDP (2020, 64.77%)
Princess Anne
Queensland CDP (2020, 72.71%)
Seat Pleasant (2020, 77.44%)
Springdale CDP (2020, 81.40%)
Woodmore CDP (2020, 79.90%)

Population 100 to 999 
Butlertown CDP (2020, 53.65%)
Georgetown CDP (2020, 51.28%)
Highland Beach (2020, 63.56%)
Maryland Park CDP (2020, 68.50%)
Upper Marlboro (2020, 59.36%)

Population under 100
Eagle Harbor (2020, 52.24%)

Michigan

Population over 100,000

Detroit (2020, 77.17%)
Population 50,000 to 99,999
Flint (2020, 55.74%)
Southfield (2020, 70.10%)

Population 10,000 to 49,999
Harper Woods (2020, 65.83%)
Inkster
Muskegon Heights
Oak Park

Population 5,000 to 9,999
Beecher CDP (2020, 66.84%)
Benton Harbor (2020, 83.15%)
Benton Heights CDP (2020, 55.67%)
Buena Vista CDP
Buena Vista Charter Township (2020, 57.93%)☆ 
Highland Park

Population 1,000 to 4,999
Lathrup Village (2020, 62.33%)
 Royal Oak Charter Township (2020, 88.88%)☆

☆ Charter townships in Michigan are city-equivalents

Mississippi

Population over 100,000
 Jackson (2020, 78.55%)

Population 25,000 to 99,999
 Greenville (2020, 80.17%)
 Hattiesburg (2020, 50.90%)
 Meridian (2020, 65.52%)

Population 10,000 to 24,999
 Brookhaven (2020, 57.48%)
 Byram (2020, 71.05%)
 Canton (2020, 72.96%)
 Clarksdale (2020, 81.49%)
 Columbus (2020, 63.71%)
 Greenwood (2020, 70.38%)
 Laurel (2020, 62.01%)
 McComb (2020, 70.59%)
 Moss Point (2020, 71.25%)
 Natchez (2020, 60.12%)
 Vicksburg (2020, 66.86%)
 West Point (2020, 62.10%)
 Yazoo City (2020, 85.60%)

Population 5,000 to 9,999
 Holly Springs (2020, 79.23%)
 Indianola (2020, 80.39%)
 Louisville (2020, 64.15%)

Population 1,000 to 4,999
 Alcorn State University CDP (2020, 98.84%)
 Aberdeen (2020, 70.63%)
 Belzoni (2020, 82.15%)
 Centreville (2020, 71.30%)
 Charleston (2020, 75.0%)
 Coldwater (2020, 74.73%)
 Collins (2020, 52.31%)
 Como (2020, 69.50%)
 Drew (2020, 84.94%)
 Durant (2020, 88.03%)
 Fayette (2020, 95.43%)
 Glendale CDP (2020, 60.26%)
 Goodman (2020, 74.64%)
 Hazlehurst (2020, 75.82%)
 Hillsboro CDP (2020, 60.17%)
 Hollandale (2020, 89.02%)
 Itta Bena (2020, 92.32%)
 Lambert (2020, 91.83%)
 Leakesville (2020, 52.48%)
 Leland (2020, 71.39%)
 Lexington (2020, 79.78%)
 Lumberton (2020, 55.29%)
 Macon (2020, 80.87%)
 Magnolia (2020, 67.76%)
 Marks (2020, 71.40%)
 Moorhead (2020, 74.50%)
 Morgantown CDP (Adams County) (2020, 69.79%)
 Mound Bayou (2020, 96.81%)
 Newton (2020, 69.64%)
 Okolona (2020, 76.48%)
 Port Gibson (2020, 88.42%)
 Rawls Springs CDP (2020, 62.31%)
 Raymond (2020, 57.35%)
 Rolling Fork (2020, 73.92%)
 Rosedale (2020, 88.07%)
 Ruleville (2020, 84.71%)
 Sardis (2020, 66.08%)
 Shannon (2020, 61.43%)
 Shaw (2020, 94.44%)
 Shelby (2020, 94.56%)
 Summit (2020, 76.88%)
 Tchula (2020, 97.28%)
 Terry (2020, 72.93%)
 Tunica Resorts CDP (2020, 75.47%)
 Tutwiler (2020, 63.93%)
 Verona (2020, 78.98%)
 Walls (2020, 60.18%)
 Waynesboro (2020, 63.24%)
 Winona (2020, 54.14%)

Population 100 to 999
 Alligator (2020, 81.90%)
 Anguilla (2020, 76.81%)
 Arcola (2020, 86.84%)
 Artesia
 Beauregard
 Benoit (2020, 77.26%)
 Beulah (2020, 90.08%)
 Bobo CDP (Coahoma County) (2020, 78.81%)
 Bogue Chitto CDP (Lincoln County) (2020, 52.63%)
 Bolton (2020, 72.56%)
 Brooksville (2020, 75.63%)
 Buckatunna CDP (2020, 57.44%)
 Bude (2020, 52.05%)
 Cary (2020, 53.94%)
 Cloverdale CDP (2020, 63.02%)
 Coahoma (2020, 98.69%)
 Coffeeville (2020,64.99%)
 Crawford
 Crenshaw (2020, 77.12%)
 Crosby (2020, 72.31%)
 Crowder (2020, 62.65%)
 Cruger (2020, 76.49%)
 Darling CDP (2020, 84.42%)
 De Kalb (2020, 71.95%)
 Derma (2020, 58.52%)
 Duck Hill (2020, 70.92%)
 Duncan (2020, 66.30%)
 Eden (2020, 55.64%)
 Edwards (2020, 84.72%)
 Elizabeth CDP (2020. 75.59%)
 Falcon (2020, 99.14%)
 Farrell (2020, 88.00%)
 Friars Point (2020, 96.65%)
 Glen Allan CDP (2020, 50.67%)
 Glendora
 Gloster (2020, 70.57%)
 Gunnison (2020, 83.39%)
 Heidelberg (2020, 85.40%)
 Hermanville CDP (2020, 95.81%)
 Hickory (2020, 55.88%)
 Isola
 Jonestown (Coahoma County) (2020, 98.13%)
 Kilmichael (2020, 53.36%)
 Lauderdale CDP (2020, 58.48%)
 Louise
 Lula (2020, 82.84%)
 Maben (2020, 64.33%)
 Mayersville (2020, 67.44%)
 Merigold (2020, 53.03%)
 Metcalfe (2020, 94.73%)
 Mississippi Valley State University CDP (2020, 73.66%)
 Morgan City
 Mount Olive (2020, 64.13%)
 North Tunica (2020, 90.53%)
 Oakland (2020, 70.35%)
 Pace (2020, 84.70%)
 Panther Burn CDP (2020, 97.39%)
 Pattison CDP (2020, 89.20%)
 Pickens (2020, 92.07%)
 Renova (2020, 94.53%)
 Roxie (2020, 62.05%)
 Schlater
 Scooba (2020, 72.45%)
 Shubuta (2020, 83.25%)
 Shuqualak (2020, 84.71%)
 Sidon
 Silver City
 Sledge (2020, 94.84%)
 State Line (2020, 54.20%)
 Sunflower (2020, 87.76%)
 Utica (2020, 67.45%)
 Vaiden (2020, 61.74%)
 Walnut Grove (2020, 69.61%)
 Webb
 Weir
 White Oak CDP (2020, 98.32%)
 Winstonville (2020, 98.04%)
 Woodville (2020, 72.95%)

Population under 100
 Austin CDP (2020, 86.27%)
 Bolivar CDP (2020, 71.79%)
 Doddsville (2020, 88.61%)
 Dundee CDP (2020, 93.15%)
 Grace CDP (2020, 72.73%)
 Nitta Yuma CDP (2020, 75.00%)
 Symonds CDP (2020, 92.67%)
 Winterville CDP (2020, 87.50%)

Missouri

Population over 10,000
 Ferguson (2020, 71.80%)
 Jennings (2020, 90.69%)
 Spanish Lake CDP (2020, 82.25%)

Population 5,000 to 9,999
 Berkeley (2020, 76.51%)
 Black Jack

Population 1,000 to 4,999
 Bel-Ridge
 Castle Point CDP
 Cool Valley
 Country Club Hills
 Dellwood
 Hanley Hills
 Hillsdale
 Moline Acres
 Normandy
 Northwoods
 Pagedale
 Pine Lawn
 Velda City
 Velda Village Hills
 Vinita Park
 Wellston

Population 100 to 999
 Beverly Hills
 Flordell Hills
 Glen Echo Park
 Greendale
 Hayti Heights
 Haywood City
 Homestown
 Howardville
 Kinloch
 Norwood Court
 Pasadena Hills
 Pasadena Park
 Uplands Park
 Vinita Terrace
 Wilson City

Population under 100
 North Lilbourn
 Penermon
 Pinhook (2020, 50.00%)

New Jersey

Population over 50,000
 East Orange (2020, 78.56%)
 Irvington (2020, 78.80%)

Population 25,000 to 49,999
 Orange
 Willingboro Township (2020, 68.80%)

Population 10,000 to 24,999
 Roselle

Population under 5,000
 Lawnside

New York
Population over 50,000
 Mount Vernon (2020, 60.43%)

Population 5,000 to 9,999
 Fairview CDP (Westchester County)
 Lakeview CDP (2020, 69.92%)

North Carolina

Population over 50,000
 Rocky Mount (2020, 63.35%)

Population 25,000 to 49,999
 Goldsboro (2020, 53.09%)

Population 10,000 to 24,999
 Elizabeth City (2020, 50.09%)
 Henderson (2020, 64.54%)
 Kinston (2020, 68.42%)

Population 5,000 to 9,999
 Oxford (2020, 54.30%)
 Wadesboro (2020, 61.88%)
 Williamston (2020, 61.62%)

Population 1,000 to 4,999
 Ahoskie (2020, 68.17%)
 Bethel (2020, 54.77%)
 Chadbourn (2020, 62.01%)
 East Spencer (2020, 68.79%)
 Edenton (2020, 52.35%)
 Elm City (2020, 53.28%)
 Enfield (2020, 84.93%)
 Fairmont (2020, 57.78%)
 La Grange (2020, 51.71%)
 Maxton (2020, 61.0%)
 Navassa (2020, 57.64%)
 Pinetops (2020, 62.42%)
 Plymouth (2020, 68.04%)
 Princeville (2020, 92.66%)
 Robersonville
 Scotland Neck (2020, 67.56%)
 Sharpsburg (2020, 61.70%)
 Weldon (2020, 72.92%)
 Windsor (2020, 61.08%)

Population 100 to 999
 Ansonville
 Bolton (2020, 57.23%)
 Bowdens CDP (2020, 60.20%)
 Brunswick (2020, 59.10%)
 Cofield 
 Conetoe
 East Arcadia
 Fair Bluff
 Fountain
 Garysburg (2020, 95.35%)
 Hamilton
 Hobgood
 Kelford
 Kingstown (2020, 88.26%)
 Lewiston Woodville
 Light Oak CDP (2020, 70.59%)
 Middleburg
 Morven
 Northwest (2020, 59.46%)
 Parmele
 Rich Square (2020, 64.54%)
 Roper
 Rowland (2020, 65.08%)
 Seaboard (2020, 78.78%)
 Silver City CDP
 South Weldon CDP
 Whitakers (2020, 69.06%)
 Winton (2020, 60.1%)

Population under 100
 Bowmore
 Hassell

Ohio

Population over 25,000
 Euclid (2020, 63.52%)
 Maple Heights

Population 10,000 to 24,999
 Bedford Heights
 East Cleveland
 Forest Park
 Trotwood
 Warrensville Heights

Population 5,000 to 9,999

Population 1,000 to 4,999
 Fort McKinley
 Golf Manor
 Highland Hills
 Lincoln Heights
 North Randall
 Oakwood, Cuyahoga County
 Silverton
 Wilberforce
 Woodlawn

Population under 1,000
 Maplewood Park CDP
 Urbancrest

Oklahoma

Population 1,000 to 4,999
 Boley
 Forest Park
 Langston
 Spencer

Population 100 to 999
 Arcadia
 Boynton
 Fort Coffee
 Grayson
 Redbird
 Rentiesville
 Summit
 Taft
 Tatum

Population under 100
 Clearview
 Meridian, Logan County

Pennsylvania

Population over 25,000
 Chester (2020, 69.19%)

Population 10,000 to 24,999
 Coatesville
 Collingdale
 Darby
 Wilkinsburg
 Yeadon

Population 5,000 to 9,999

Population 1,000 to 4,999
 Braddock (2020, 70.83%)
 Colwyn
 East Lansdowne
 Homestead
 Rankin
 South Coatesville

South Carolina

Population 10,000 to 24,999
 Dentsville CDP (2020, 68.33%)
 Gantt CDP (2020, 	50.17%)
 Orangeburg (2020, 76.43%)
 St. Andrews CDP (2020, 64.58%)

Population 5,000 to 9,999
 Bennettsville (2020, 64.52%)
 Cheraw (2020, 52.40%)
 Chester (2020, 65.44%)
 Darlington (2020, 60.37%)
 Dillon (2020, 53.54%)
 Georgetown (2020, 51.67%)
 Lake City (2020, 78.72%)
 Marion (2020, 69.77%)
 Woodfield CDP (2020, 55.39%)

Population 1,000 to 4,999
 Allendale (2020, 85.75%)
 Andrews (2020, 62.49%)
 Arthurtown CDP (2020, 50.78%)
 Bamberg (2020, 57.54%)
 Barnwell (2020, 51.44%)
 Bishopville (2020, 70.60%)
 Blackville (2020, 82.32%)
 Brookdale CDP
 Calhoun Falls (2020, 55.07%)
 Capitol View CDP (2020, 56.67%)
 Edisto CDP (2020, 71.53%)
 Denmark (2020, 89.74%)
 Edgefield (2020, 52.58%)
 Estill (2020, 77.59%)
 Fairfax (2020, 78.87%)
 Gadsden CDP (2020, 88.7%)
 Holly Hill (2020, 50.62%)
 Hopkins CDP (2020, 80.07%)
 Johnston (2020, 62.59%)
 Kingstree (2020, 69.51%)
 Manning (2020, 64.11%)
 McCormick (2020, 65.73%)
 Mullins (2020, 68.01%)
 Pamplico
 Ridgeville
 Seabrook CDP (2020, 62.31%)
 St. Matthews (2020, 58.01%)
 St. Stephen (2020, 51.56%)
 South Sumter
 Timmonsville
 Varnville (2020, 61.89%)
 Wilkinson Heights CDP
 Williston (2020, 51.62%)
 Winnsboro (2020, 59.91%)
 Yemassee (2020, 58.33%)

Population 100 to 999
 Adams Run CDP (2020, 62.00%)
 Blenheim
 Bowman (2020, 68.78%)
 Browntown CDP (2020, 84.47%)
 Bucksport CDP (2020, 88.59%)
 Carlisle
 Cash CDP (2020, 82.70%)
 Centenary CDP (2020, 73.30%)
 Clarks Hill CDP
 Clio
 Cokesbury CDP
 Cross Hill
 Dale CDP (2020, 77.57%)
 Daviston CDP (2020, 51.08%)
 Dovesville CDP (2020, 60.22%)
 Dunbar CDP (2020, 96.42%)
 Eastover (2020, 91.69%)
 Ehrhardt
 Elliott CDP (2020, 85.68%)
 Elko
 Finklea CDP (2020, 63.57%)
 Foreston CDP (2020, 78.62%)
 Furman
 Gifford
 Greeleyville
 Helena CDP (2020, 84.14%)
 Kline
 Lane
 Little Rock CDP (2020, 58.36%)
 Lobeco CDP (2020, 53.08%)
 Lynchburg
 Manville CDP (2020, 67.52%)
 Mayesville
 Mount Carmel CDP
 Newtown CDP (2020, 95.58%)
 Norway
 Pinewood
 Promised Land CDP	
 Quinby
 Rembert CDP
 Richburg
 Ridge Spring
 Rowesville
 Santee (2020, 65.87%)
 Scotia
 Scranton
 Sellers
 Sheldon CDP (2020, 67.36%)
 Shiloh, Sumter County CDP
 Society Hill
 St. Charles CDP (2020, 51.75%)
 Stuckey
 Summerton (2020, 52.83%)
 Vance
 Wagener (2020, 58.32%)
 Waterloo
 Wisacky CDP (2020, 96.76%)
 Woodford
 Zion CDP (2020, 86.76%)

Population under 100
 Coosawhatchie CDP (2020, 70.18%)
 Cope
 Willington CDP

Tennessee

Population over 500,000
Memphis (2020, 61.28%)

Population 5,000 to 9,999
Bolivar (2020, 63.46%)
Brownsville (2020, 66.48%)

Population 1,000 to 5,999
Mason (2020, 68.36%)
Whiteville (2020, 56.45%)

Population under 1,000
Gallaway
Henning (2020, 71.30%)
Stanton

Texas

Population over 25,000
 Cedar Hill (2020, 52.47%)
 Lancaster (2020, 65.60%)

Population 10,000 to 24,999
 Fresno CDP (2020, 55.91%)

Population 5,000 to 9,999
 Prairie View (2020, 82.01%)

Population 1,000 to 4,999
 San Augustin (2020, 50.42%)

Population 100 to 999
 Ames (2020, 74.71%)
 Calvert (2020, 50.10%)
 Cuney (2020, 59.48%)
 Easton (2020, 51.90%)
 Goodlow
 Kendleton
 Moore Station (2020, 88.75%)
 Seven Oaks

Population under 100
 Domino (2020, 83.10%)
 Toco (2020, 61.54%)

Virginia

Population over 50,000
 Portsmouth☆ (2020, 52.68%)

Population 25,000 to 49,999
 Danville☆ (2020, 51.03%)
 Petersburg☆ (2020, 73.32%)

Population 10,000 to 24,999
 East Highland Park CDP (2020, 83.13%)
 Highland Springs CDP (2020, 69.11%)

Population 5,000 to 9,999
 Chamberlayne CDP (2020, 54.74%)
 Emporia☆ (2020, 62.97%)
 Ettrick CDP (2020, 68.46%)
 Franklin☆ (2020, 56.36%)
 Montrose CDP (2020, 68.14%)

Population 1,000 to 4,999
 Lawrenceville (2020, 73.08%)
 Rushmere CDP
 Waverly (2020, 67.01%)

Population under 1,000
 Bayside CDP (Accomack County) (2020, 77.57%)
 Boston CDP (Accomack County) (2020, 79.07%)
 Cats Bridge CDP (2020, 85.87%)
 Charles City CDP (2020, 50.96%)
 Dendron (2020, 56.18%)
 Jarratt (2020, 54.60%)
 Laurel Park CDP
 Makemie Park CDP (2020, 81.16%)
 Metompkin CDP (2020, 67.96%)
 Sandy Level CDP
 Savageville CDP (2020, 74.29%)
 Whitesville CDP (2020, 52.56%)

Population under 100
 Locust Mount CDP (2020, 80.77%)
 Savage Town CDP (2020, 88.89%)

☆ Independent City

West Virginia
Population under 1,000
 Keystone (2020, 57.39%)
 Kimball (2020, 53.79%)

Counties

Alabama
Bullock County (2020, 71.33%)
Dallas County (2020, 69.71%)
Greene County (2020, 80.56%)
Hale County (2020, 56.23%)
Lowndes County (2020, 69.33%)
Macon County (2020, 78.82%)
Marengo County (2020, 52.44%)
Montgomery County (2020, 56.69%)
Perry County (2020, 69.49%)
Sumter County (2020, 72.54%)
Wilcox County (2020, 70.05%)

Arkansas
Chicot County (2020, 52.77%)
Crittenden County (2020, 53.58%)
Jefferson County (2020, 56.07%)
Lee County (2020, 54.15%)
Phillips County (2020, 62.20%)
St. Francis County (2020, 54.14%)

Florida
Gadsden County (2020, 53.22%)

Georgia
Bibb County (2020, 54.17%)
Calhoun County (2020, 64.04%)
Clay County (2020, 55.93%)
Clayton County (2020, 68.99%)
DeKalb County (2020, 50.29%)
Dougherty County (2020, 69.61%)
Early County (2020, 50.99%)
Hancock County (2020, 68.98%)
Jefferson County (2020, 50.74%)
Macon County (2020, 59.18%)
Randolph County (2020, 60.11%)
Richmond County (2020, 54.67%)
Rockdale County (2020, 57.48%)
Sumter County (2020, 50.82%)
Talbot County (2020, 53.31%)
Taliaferro County (2020, 53.43%)
Terrell County (2020, 60.32%)
Warren County (2020, 58.43%)
Washington County (2020, 53.52%)

Louisiana
East Carroll Parish (2020, 69.23%)
Madison Parish (2020, 61.63%)
Orleans Parish, Louisiana (2020, 53.61%)
St. Helena Parish (2020, 53.53%)
St. John the Baptist Parish (2020, 56.68%)
Tensas Parish (2020, 53.82%)

Maryland
Prince George's County (2020, 59.13%)

Mississippi
Adams County (2020, 56.57%)
Bolivar County (2020, 62.15%)
Claiborne County (2020, 87.13%)
Clay County (2020, 57.87%)
Coahoma County (2020, 75.78%)
Copiah County (2020, 50.28%)
Hinds County (2020, 69.15%)
Holmes County (2020, 83.49%)
Humphreys County (2020, 78.00%)
Issaquena County (2020, 55.90%)
Jasper County (2020, 50.86%)
Jefferson County (2020, 84.55%)
Jefferson Davis County (2020, 58.49%)
Kemper County (2020, 61.04%)
Leflore County (2020, 73.43%)
Noxubee County (2020, 69.91%)
Pike County (2020, 53.21%)
Quitman County (2020, 73.61%)
Sharkey County (2020, 70.29%)
Sunflower County (2020, 69.60%)
Tallahatchie County (2020, 58.12%)
Tunica County (2020, 76.35%)
Washington County (2020, 71.05%)
Wilkinson County (2020, 67.12%)
Yazoo County (2020, 59.13%)

North Carolina
Bertie County (2020, 59.52%)
Edgecombe County (2020, 55.83%)
Halifax County (2020, 50.88%)
Hertford County (2020, 56.68%)
Northampton County (2020, 55.23%)

South Carolina
Allendale County (2020, 70.23%)
Bamberg County (2020, 58.22%)
Fairfield County (2020, 53.47%)
Hampton County (2020, 51.38%)
Lee County (2020, 60.82%)
Marion County (2020, 55.97%)
Orangeburg County (2020, 60.32%)
Williamsburg County (2020, 63.11%)

Tennessee
Haywood County (2020, 50.34%)
Shelby County (2020, 51.10%)

Virginia
Brunswick County (2020, 54.09%)
Greensville County (2020, 58.08%)
Sussex County (2020, 53.25%)

See also

 List of U.S. cities with large African-American populations—over 30%, ranked by percentage
 List of African American neighborhoods
 Lists of U.S. cities with non-white majority populations
 List of U.S. counties with African American majority populations

References 

African American
African American-related lists